Piuma may refer to:

Danieli Piuma, motor glider
Piúma, a municipality located in the Brazilian state of Espírito Santo
Piuma (film), a 2016 Italian film